The 2014 CIS Men's University Cup Hockey Tournament (52nd Annual) was held March 20–23, 2014. It was the second of two consecutive CIS Championships to be held at the Credit Union Centre in Saskatoon hosted by the University of Saskatchewan. The defending champions were the UNB Varsity Reds, but they would not be able to defend their title having been eliminated in the second round of the AUS playoffs by the Saint Mary's Huskies.

Road to the Cup

AUS playoffs
The AUS were held from February 19 to March 10, 2014.

OUA playoffs
The OUA playoffs were held from February 19 to March 15, 2014.

Canada West playoffs
The Canada West playoffs were held from February 21 to March 8, 2014.

University Cup
The six teams to advance to the tournament are listed below. The wild-card team was selected from the OUA Conference as the AUS was provided the wild-card in 2013 and CW teams are ineligible as they are the host conference. To avoid having two(2) CW teams in the same pool, Saskatchewan was swapped with Carleton.

Pool A - Afternoon
Pool A games were played from March 20 to March 22, 2014.

Pool B - Evening

Championship final

Bench assignments for the championship final (home/visitor) is based on each advancing team's record and stats from their 2 game pool games, not their tournament seed. Saskatchewan is the home team with a 2-0 record (4pts) and a GF/GA ratio of 12/2 = 6.0 versus Alberta with a 2-0 record (4pts) and a GF/GA ratio of 6/4 = 1.5.

Tournament All-Stars
Derek Hulak, from the Saskatchewan Huskies, was selected as the Major W.J. 'Danny' McLeod Award for CIS University Cup MVP. Hulak led all players in goals (4) and points (6) in the tournament.

Joining Hulakon on the tournament all-star team were:
Forward: Kruise Reddick (Alberta Golden Bears)
Forward: Brett Ferguson (Alberta Golden Bears)
Defenseman: Jesse Craig (Alberta Golden Bears)
Defenseman: Kendall McFaull (Saskatchewan Huskies)
Goalie: Jacob Gervais-Chouinard (McGill Redmen)

References

External links
 Tournament Website

U Sports ice hockey
Ice hockey competitions in Saskatchewan
University Cup, 2014
Sports competitions in Saskatoon